Poland competed at the 1978 European Athletics Championships in Prague, Czech Republic, from 29 August - 3 September 1978. A delegation of 46 athletes were sent to represent the country. Poland won seven medals at the Championships.

Medals

References 

Nations at the 1978 European Athletics Championships
Poland at the European Athletics Championships
1978 in Poland